Antonio "Tony" Pietro Ally (born Ali, 17 August 1973) is a British diver.

Early life
Ally was brought up in Catford, London and had a difficult start to life after being diagnosed with a hearing disorder during childhood. When he was nine, his brother died and later reasoned that hearing his brother's voice "spurred him on for 19 years". He used to enjoy kickboxing as a child but only as a means of training. He moved to Sheffield in 1992 and trained at Ponds Forge, a leisure complex.

Diving career
Ally won his first senior national championship when he was aged 12, with coaching being done by lip-reading, as Ally expressed being too proud to wear "old, ugly, cumbersome" hearing aids in his earlier years. Around the same time, he represented Great Britain in Strasbourg and beat all his competition.

Olympic Games
In Ally's first Olympic Games he competed in the 1996 men's 3 metre springboard at the 1996 Summer Olympics in Atalanta, United States. Four years later he competed in the 2000 men's 3 metre springboard and qualified for the final, finishing in 12th place. He also competed in the synchronized event with Mark Shipman and came seventh. At the 1996 Olympics in Atlanta he publicised the plight of British divers and the lack of funded support by publicly selling his British Olympic Team kit to pay off loans.

Commonwealth Games
Ally competed in five Commonwealth Games winning four medals. He represented England in the springboard and platform events, at the 1990 Commonwealth Games in Auckland, New Zealand, his first of five Commonwealth Games appearances. In 1998 he was a bronze medalist in the 3 metres springboard, at the Games in Kuala Lumpur. He followed this success up by winning double silver in 2002 before going on to be the flag bearer for the English contingent in 2006 in Melbourne where he won another silver medal in the synchronized three metre springboard.

European Championships
Ally won gold in the European Championships for the three metre event in 1999, being the first British diver to win the medal. The achievement came just a year after a significant motorbike accident in Italy and is considered by Ally as being among his most memorable sporting moments.

Club
Ally's diving club is the City of Sheffield.

Boxing
Outside of diving, Ally also trained in boxing, having said during a 2005 interview that he wished he had taken up the sport 20 years earlier. After being urged by a friend, he started training around 2002 in the St Thomas' Boys Club gym, where former world super-featherweight champion Naseem Hamed also trained. Ally attributed his healthier lifestyle to boxing, having lost  and significantly reduced his body fat. Despite being keen to take up boxing professionally, he was apprehensive about the risk of losing his lottery funding that financed his diving career, noting that he would have already turned to boxing if it weren't for that.

Personal life
During a holiday in Italy in 1998, Ally was involved in a motorbike accident which almost destroyed all muscles in his right arm. The damage was severe enough that surgeons needed to take muscle from his forearm and regrow it.

Ally appeared on The Million Pound Drop Live on 8 October 2011, and lost. On 11 August 2012, he appeared on BBC News Live programme, as part of a panel discussion about Tom Daley's diving progression. It was announced Ally works as a strength and conditioning coach.

References

English male divers
Divers at the 1990 Commonwealth Games
Divers at the 1994 Commonwealth Games
Divers at the 1996 Summer Olympics
Divers at the 1998 Commonwealth Games
Divers at the 2000 Summer Olympics
Divers at the 2002 Commonwealth Games
Divers at the 2004 Summer Olympics
Commonwealth Games silver medallists for England
Commonwealth Games bronze medallists for England
Sportspeople from Luton
Sportspeople from Sheffield
1973 births
Living people
Commonwealth Games medallists in diving
Olympic divers of Great Britain
Medallists at the 1998 Commonwealth Games
Medallists at the 2002 Commonwealth Games
Medallists at the 2006 Commonwealth Games